Norm Macdonald (1959–2021) was a Canadian comedian and actor.

Norm Macdonald, or similar, may also refer to:

Norm McDonald (footballer, born 1898) (1898–1976), Australian rules footballer for Footscray
Norm McDonald (footballer, born 1925) (1925–2002), Australian rules footballer for Essendon
Norm Macdonald (politician), Canadian politician
Norman McDonald's Country Drive-Inn, restaurant in Philpot, Kentucky, U.S.